Nader Abdulkarim Joukhadar (19 October 1977 – 6 February 2023) was a Syrian football coach and player. He played as a forward for Syria in the 1996 Asian Cup.

Joukhadar died in Jableh, alongside his son, during the 2023 Turkey–Syria earthquake. He was 45.

Managerial career
In July 2022, Joukhadar was appointed head coach of Salam Zgharta in the Lebanese Premier League. He was dismissed on 10 August.

References

External links
 
 

1977 births
2023 deaths
Syrian footballers
Association football forwards
Al-Wathba SC players
Al-Faisaly SC players
Al-Wehdat SC players
Syrian Premier League players
Jordanian Pro League players
Syria youth international footballers
Syria international footballers
Syrian expatriate footballers
Syrian expatriate sportspeople in Jordan
Expatriate footballers in Jordan
Syrian football managers
Salam Zgharta FC managers
Lebanese Premier League managers
1996 AFC Asian Cup players
Syrian expatriate football managers
Syrian expatriate sportspeople in Lebanon
Expatriate football managers in Lebanon
Victims of the 2023 Turkey–Syria earthquakes